Gabriele Morganti (born 23 November 1958, in Senigallia) is an Italian professional football player and manager.

Career
In 1975, he began his professional career for the Vigor Senigallia. Also he played for the Cesena, Catanzaro, SPAL, Como and L.R. Vicenza.

In 1997, he started his coaching career in Vigor Senigallia. Since 2000, he coached the Chieti. Later on worked with the L'Aquila. In 2002–2003 season he led the San Marino Calcio. In 2003, became the new coach of Fano. In 2005–2006 season he again coached the Chieti. Later he Fossombrone, Civitanovese and Marotta.

References

External links

1958 births
Living people
Italian footballers
Association football defenders
A.C. Cesena players
U.S. Catanzaro 1929 players
S.P.A.L. players
Como 1907 players
Italian football managers
A.S.D. Victor San Marino managers
Alma Juventus Fano 1906 managers
People from Senigallia
Sportspeople from the Province of Ancona
Footballers from Marche